A quadrat block (or quadrate block) is a virtual rectangle or square in Egyptian hieroglyphic text.

The glyphs (hieroglyphs) can be variable in number within the virtual block, though they are often proportioned according to variable standardized rules of scribal methods.

The definition for the block in Illustrated Hieroglyphics Handbook by Schumann-Antelme and Rossini, is: "A 'quadrate' is a virtual square, which although not drawn, guides the hand of the scribe. Hieroglyphs must be aesthetically positioned within the quadrate and their size must be proportioned accordingly. They form groups that are pleasing to the eye and based on the laws of balance."

Rosetta Stone closeup

An example of five lines of text from the Rosetta Stone, (lines 9, 10, 11, 12, 13), shows a width of about six to seven virtual blocks. Line 12, (fourth line) is illustrative of the variable size, in this case the widths, of the 'virtual quadrate blocks'.

The time of the festivals are stated as: "...day 1 up to day 5...", (three blocks)

N5:Z1-(day-1)-(tall-narrow-block)
nfr-t:D21-(up to)-(square-block)
O4*N5:Z1*Z1*Z1*Z1*Z1-(day-5)-(square-block)

The three blocks:

N5:Z1-nfr-t:D21-O4*N5:Z1*Z1*Z1*Z1*Z1-(day-1-up to-day-5)

In running text blocks, prepositions can sometimes start or end a block, but may be part of the next block's translation. Running texts will sometimes actually end in the very middle of the next square. This can be accomplished because some of the prepositions come in vertical and horizontal forms:

O34-s-(horizontal-vert-eSSes), M-m-(horizontal-vert-eMs), N-n-(vert-horizontal-eNs)
(See: N-red crown (n hieroglyph), N-water ripple (n hieroglyph))

Amun-Ra's block
Most commonly in hieroglyphs, Amun is referenced without Amun-Ra. The two blocks for Amun and Amun-Ra are: M17-Y5:N35, (or M17-Y5::N35 ), and i-Y5:N35:N5*Z1. Note how the vertical hieroglyph for reed-(the i for 'Amun') is actually part of the block, though at its side.

See also
 Egyptian hieroglyphs
 Egyptian Hieroglyph Format Controls (Unicode block)

References

Budge.  The Rosetta Stone, E.A.Wallace Budge, (Dover Publications), c 1929, Dover edition(unabridged), 1989. (softcover)
Schumann-Antelme, and Rossini, 1998. Illustrated Hieroglyphics Handbook, Ruth Schumann-Antelme, and Stéphane Rossini. c 1998, English trans. 2002, Sterling Publishing Co. (Index, Summary lists (tables), selected uniliterals, biliterals, and triliterals.) (softcover)

External links
Glyphotext definition for 'quadrat'

Egyptian hieroglyphs